The Iksan–Pohang Expressway() is an Expressway in South Korea connecting Iksan to Pohang.  Numbered 20, it is in two parts, so a complete journey along this route must make use of other roads.

List of facilities

IC: Interchange, JC: Junction, SA: Service Area, TG:Tollgate

See also 
 Roads and expressways in South Korea
 Transportation in South Korea

External links 
 MOLIT South Korean Government Transport Department

Expressways in South Korea
Roads in North Jeolla
Roads in Daegu
Roads in North Gyeongsang